Pomona–North station, formerly Pomona (North), is a railroad station located in Pomona, California. It is located just west of Garey Avenue and south of Bonita Avenue, and has 225 free parking spaces, which are accessible from either Santa Fe Street or Fulton Road.

The Pomona–North station serves Metrolink's San Bernardino Line crossing the northern part of the city. A separate station called Pomona station (informally called "Downtown Pomona station", is located Downtown a few miles/kilometers to the south and also near Garey Avenue, is an Amtrak station that also serves Metrolink trains on the Riverside Line.

By 2025, the Metro A Line is planned to also serve this station when the line is extended east from APU/Citrus College station.

The Pomona–North station is owned by the City of Pomona. A freight line (ex-ATSF Pasadena Subdivision) runs along the north side of the station. The old Santa Fe station lies to the east of the station, on the northwest corner of Santa Fe and Garey Avenue. Foothill Transit provides connecting service on Garey Avenue, with stops at Garey and Bonita Avenue for Lines 291 and 492, and stops at Garey Avenue and Arrow Highway for Lines 197 and 291, both approximately a half mile (800 meters) from the station. Both bus and rail service are available 7 days a week.

This site was the home to the Los Angeles and San Gabriel Valley Railroad station opened in 1887.  In 1887 there was debate as to call the station the: North Pomona Station or Palomares Station or Palermo Station.

Metrolink's operations center is located near the station.

References

External links 
 
 Foothill Transit

Metrolink stations in Los Angeles County, California
Future Los Angeles Metro Rail stations
Railway stations in the United States opened in 1992
Pacific Electric stations